Trust Me is a 1989 American crime film written and directed  by Robert Houston and starring Adam Ant, David Packer and Talia Balsam.

Plot

Cast 

 Adam Ant as James Callendar 
 David Packer as  	Sam Brown 
 Talia Balsam as  	Catherine Walker 
 William De Acutis as Billy Brawthwaite
 Joyce Van Patten as Nettie Brown
 Barbara Bain as Mary Casal
  Brooke Davida  as Denise Tipton
 Simon McQueen  as Holly Windsor
 Alma Beltran as Imelda
 Marilyn Tokuda  as Chic Girl 
 Barbara Perry as Severe Woman 
 Virgil Frye as Thug
 Rance Howard as Vern

References

External links 

1980s crime films
American crime films
1980s English-language films
1980s American films